Tor dongnaiensis, common name Dongnai manseer, is a species of cyprinid of the genus Tor. It inhabits Vietnam's Đồng Nai and is considered harmless to humans. Described in 2015, it has been assessed as "near threatened" on the IUCN Red List.

References

Hoáng, H.D., H.M. Pham, J.-D. Durand, N.T. Trȧn and P.Đ. Phan, 2015. Mahseers genera Tor and Neolissochilus (Teleostei: Cyprinidae) from southern Vietnam. Zootaxa 4006(3):551-568. 

Cyprinid fish of Asia
Fish of Vietnam
Fish described in 2015
IUCN Red List near threatened species